The 1978–79 Anglo-Scottish Cup was the fourth edition of the tournament. It was won by Burnley, who beat Oldham Athletic in a two-legged final by 4–2 on aggregate.

English Group

Group A

Group B

Group C

Group D

Scottish Group

1st Round 1st Leg 
{|
|-
|valign="top"|

1st Round 2nd Leg 
{|
|-
|valign="top"|

Quarter-finals 1st Leg

Quarter-finals 2nd Leg

Semi-finals 1st Leg

Semi-finals 2nd Leg

Final 1st Leg

Final 2nd Leg

Notes and references

1978–79 in English football
1978–79 in Scottish football